Hartaval  (669 m) is a hill on the Isle of Skye. It is located on the Trotternish peninsula in the north of the isle, and is the second highest peak on Trotternish ridge after The Storr.

It has a fine, steep face on its eastern side that was formed by a series of landslides.

References

Grahams
Marilyns of Scotland
Mountains and hills of the Isle of Skye